Donna Loren (born March 7, 1947) is an American singer and actress. A prolific performer in the 1960s, she was the "Dr Pepper Girl" from 1963 to 1968, featured female vocalist on Shindig, and a cast member of the American International Pictures Beach Party movie franchise. She was signed to Capitol Records in 1964, releasing several singles and the Beach Blanket Bingo LP soundtrack, which included her signature song "It Only Hurts When I Cry".

Loren guest-starred on episodic television series including Dr. Kildare, Batman, and The Monkees, as well as appeared regularly on network and local variety and music shows.

In 1968, Loren retired from her career to marry and raise a family. She recorded again in the 1980s and ran her own fashion business, ADASA Hawaii, throughout the 1990-2000s. In 2009, she returned to performing, and her most recent releases include the album Love It Away (2010) and the EP Donna Does Elvis in Hawaii (2010), as well as the compilation These Are the Good Times: The Complete Capitol Recordings (2014). Her first book, Pop Sixties: Shindig!, Dick Clark, Beach Party, and Photographs from the Donna Loren Archive, was released in 2017. In August, 2020, Loren began hosting Love's A Secret Weapon Podcast, an audio memoir of her life and career.

Early years
Loren was born March 7, 1947, in Boston, Massachusetts. Her mother Ruth and her adoptive father Morey Zukor (Morris Zukovsky) are deceased. Morey and his brother, Louis, were animators. She has two younger brothers, Alan and Rick Zukovsky.

Loren performed in amateur talent shows from the early age of six and, in 1955, sang on a radio commercial for Meadow Gold Ice Cream appearing with Dick Beals, who was famous for playing the character of Speedy Alka Seltzer.

In the same year, she was a frequent performer on the music radio series Sqeakin' Deacon with James Burton, a musician with whom she would work many times throughout her career. By 1956, she was performing with The Moppets Group and also recorded a single "I Think It's Almost Christmas Time" (Fable).

On her tenth birthday, Loren filmed an appearance on The Mickey Mouse Club for the Friday "Talent Round-Up Day", performing the songs "I Didn't Know the Gun was Loaded" and "Pennies from Heaven".

Loren continued to perform and record through the late 1950s and early 1960s, with her songs released on Skylark and Ramada, as well as the American Publishing Company's new label Crest. Her first two efforts for that label, "Hands Off", written by Billy Page, arranged by his brother Gene Page, and Glen Campbell's "I'm So Lonely" were produced by Jimmy Bowen – another person who would play a significant role throughout Loren's career – and were recorded at Gold Star Studios. It was also at Crest that she began to use the professional name Donna Loren, having previously recorded under the names of Donna Zukor (Morey's pen-name and Donna's legal name), Donna Dee, and Barbie Ames.  On television, Loren appeared on Playhouse 90 episode "In the Presence of Mine Enemies" (1960).

Dr Pepper
In 1963, while still a student at Venice High School in West Los Angeles, Loren signed a contract with Dr Pepper as the "Dr Pepper Girl" to promote the drink to a younger demographic. National exposure via radio, print, television and personal singing appearances followed. One of her first appearances for the company as its spokesperson was co-hosting, with Dick Clark (with whom she worked regularly), the ABC television one-hour special Celebrity Party, sponsored by Dr Pepper. She performed "Bill Bailey" and her record "I Can't Make My Heart Say Goodbye".

Dr Pepper historian Harry E. Ellis described Loren as "an immediate success. She became widely known in a short period as 'The Dr Pepper Girl', appearing at special events and on programs sponsored by the Company. Miss Loren would figure prominently in Dr Pepper’s plans for some five years, not only as an entertainer but doing commercials for radio and TV and appearing in many forms of advertising. She appeared on 24-sheet poster boards, point-of-sale and on Dr Pepper calendars." Loren made hundreds of personal appearances for the company, where she would perform and meet fans, including an appearance at the 1964 New York World's Fair, with Dick Clark and Loren as "host and hostess" for winners of a large Dr Pepper promotion. In the same year, Loren was part of Clark's Caravan of Stars 22-city Summer tour, headlined by Gene Pitney. As Loren recalled in 2011, "I travelled all over the country, and I performed for them in every city that had a Dr Pepper bottling plant. I cut all the ribbons for all the new plant openings. I did all their TV and radio commercials, and all their print advertising and billboards."

Away from Dr Pepper, Loren was a regular performer at concerts and shows during much of the decade throughout the country. These included at the teenage nightclub The Million Cellars, with Glen Campbell also on the bill, the Pasadena Teen Dances, Rock 'N Roll City with Shindig co-star Bobby Sherman, and appearing with Bob Hope and The Kingsmen at Indiana University's 'Little 500' race weekend in May, 1965. She also performed at the Greater Los Angeles Press Club's 1967 "Headliner of the Year" awards, where then Governor of California Ronald Reagan was recognized as "the state's outstanding newsmaker for 1966", and crowned the 1967 "Teen Safety Queen" at the Municipal Auditorium in Dodge City.

Challenge Records
From 1962 to 1963, Loren recorded with Challenge. She released six singles, including "I'm in Love with the Ticket Taker at the Bijou Movie" (B Side: "I'm Gonna Be All Right", subsequently re-released as an A Side, with "Johnny's Got Something"), "On the Good Ship Lollipop" (B Side: "If You Love Me (Really Love Me)"), and "Dream World" (B side: "(Remember Me) I'm the One Who Loves You"). Nancy Mantz and Dave Burgess co-wrote two of Loren's Challenge songs (they also wrote one song each with other collaborators), and her arrangers included Sonny Bono. Loren's recording of "Dream World" written by Joy Kennedy was awarded four stars by Billboard in their new singles reviews. While only in her mid-teens, Loren recorded songs such as "If You Love Me (Really Love Me)" and "(Remember Me) I'm the One Who Loves You". Loren said of her early recording, "Somehow I had a knowledge in me that came through my voice and therefore more mature songs were chosen and adapted for recording".

Beach Party movies and Capitol Records
In 1964 Loren began appearing in the American International Pictures' Beach Party series. In Loren's first appearance in Muscle Beach Party, she sang "Muscle Bustle" with Dick Dale. The Galveston Daily News wrote "It didn't take long for Donna, Dr Pepper's new singing star to make her mark. She has a feature singing part". The release of the single "Muscle Bustle", written by Brian Wilson, Gary Usher, and Roger Christian would be Loren's final recording for Challenge (B Side: "How Can I Face the World").

Loren would then appear in Bikini Beach (singing "Love's a Secret Weapon"), and Pajama Party ("Among the Young"). An article regarding the release of Pajama Party described "the amazingly-voiced Donna Loren, seventeen-year-old songstress who made her debut in Muscle Beach Party and who makes a bigger impression each time she sings. She will be seen and heard next in Beach Blanket Bingo". She appeared in the series in the fifth film Beach Blanket Bingo in 1965, performing "It Only Hurts When I Cry", which some regard as her "signature tune". The film resulted in Loren's first album, Beach Blanket Bingo. Loren told Adam Gerace of the recording of the album: "I worked for 14 hours straight. The album was completed in that session". The album was released on Capitol Records (which Loren had signed with in 1964), produced by David Axelrod, and arranged and conducted by H. B. Barnum.

Loren also appeared in another AIP Beach Party film, Sergeant Deadhead, where she sang "Two Timin' Angel". The film starred other regular Beach Party actors, including Frankie Avalon, Deborah Walley, Harvey Lembeck, John Ashley, Bobbi Shaw, and Buster Keaton.

At Capitol, Loren released many of her well-known songs including "Blowing Out the Candles" and (B Side) "Just a Little Girl" (1964), which were produced by Axelrod and arranged and conducted by Barnum, "So, Do The Zonk" (B Side: "New Love" from her LP) (1965), "Call Me" (B Side: "Smokey Joe's"), (1965), and "I Believe" (1965; regularly performed in her Dr Pepper appearances).

In late 1964, the Hollywood Makeup Artists and Hair Stylists Guild named Loren one of its Deb Stars, an annual award given to up-and-coming performers, who were "the likeliest candidates for motion picture and television stardom in the coming years". Other "most likely star candidates of 1965" were Janet Landgard, Margaret Mason, Tracy McHale, Mary Ann Mobley, Barbara Parkins, Laurie Sibbald, Wendy Stuart, Beverly Washburn, and Raquel Welch. Loren was also nominated for a 1965 Photoplay Gold Medal Award for "Most Promising New Star (Female)".

Shindig

Loren was the featured female vocalist on Shindig from its debut on September 16, 1964, until late 1965. Hosted by Jimmy O'Neill and produced by Jack Good, the series has been described as "different from previous U.S. rock 'n' roll programs. It featured non-stop music that, in most cases, was only interrupted by the commercial breaks", and "most of the top American and British rock/pop acts of the mid-1960s appeared on Shindig!". These included The Beatles (from England) in October 1964. Loren debuted on the program performing "Wishin' and Hopin'", with other performances on the premiere episode by Sam Cooke, The Everly Brothers, The Righteous Brothers, The Wellingtons, Jackie and Gayle, Bobby Sherman, The Blossoms, Alan Sues, and the Shindig dancers.

On the series, Loren performed a wide range of material both in solos and work with other performers, most often Bobby Sherman. Songs included "Shakin' All Over", "Goldfinger", "Ain't That Loving, You, Baby", "Too Many Fish in the Sea", "Boys", "I am Ready", "Rock Me in the Cradle", "Cycle Set", "African Waltz", "It's Alright", "The Boy from New York City", "The Way of Love", "Down the Line", "That's What Love", "Where Have All the Flowers Gone", "With the Wind & the Rain in Your Hair", and "Personality".

Loren has referred to her enjoyment of appearing on the series, telling Adam Gerace, "The microphone that I used was the greatest. I loved the sounds that came out". She said during a radio interview with "Bulldog" Bill Feingold on KNews Radio (Palm Springs, CA) on November 11, 2009, of her professional work on Shindig, "It was fantastic. It was really the highlight of my life". Loren sang on 26 shows, and was a well-known member of the cast. She also appeared in the live theatre show "Shindig '65". In 1991, Loren appeared with several other cast members in the VH1 retrospective special of the series, The Shindig Show.

Other television and acting
In 1966, Loren became a co-star with Bobby Rydell on The Milton Berle Show, a variety series hosted by Berle and co-starring Irving Benson. The signing of Loren and Rydell was widely reported at the time. The series was subsequently aired for a short 13 weeks.

Loren guest-starred on a seven-part Dr. Kildare in 1965 as Anna Perrona, a young woman in need of dialysis treatment. In 1966, she played Susie in two episodes (15 and 16) of Batman ("The Joker Goes to School", "He Meets His Match, the Grisly Ghoul"). In a guide to the week's television, her character was described as "Aiding The Joker is Donna Loren, a frisky cheerleader". Loren's kiss with Batman co-star Burt Ward (Robin) was reportedly accompanied by "a flood of mail". Loren also guest-starred on The Monkees (episode: "Everywhere a Sheik, Sheik", 1967) as Princess Colette, who Davy is set to marry; and on Gomer Pyle, U.S.M.C. (episode: "Love and Goulash", 1968) as Anna Kovach, who hides a romance from her family. She also appeared on The Mothers-In-Law in 1968.

Loren made hundreds of appearances on numerous variety, music, and game shows. Many of these were multiple appearances and included American Bandstand, The Lloyd Thaxton Show, The Regis Philbin Show, What's This Song, The Red Skelton Show (singing "Johnny One Note" and "The Way of Love"), Hollywood A Go-Go, Top 40!, 9th Street West, Groovy, Boss City, Where the Action Is, Nightlife, Celebrity Game, The Dating Game, The Joey Bishop Show, The Steve Allen Show, The Pat Boone Show (including an episode co-hosted by Milton Berle), The Woody Woodbury Show, and week-long stints on Hollywood Squares. She also appeared on New Talent in Young America in January 1965, a special where "Youthful artists making great strides in the field of music are showcased in this hour-long Special".

On March 11, 1968, "Two for Penny" aired on The Danny Thomas Hour. The series was "an all-purpose hour hosted by Danny Thomas. Presentations included musical programs, comedy and variety hours, and filmed dramas".  Loren starred as Greek-American Penny Kanopolis, whose brothers (Michael Constantine and Lou Antonio) try to organize a courtship and marriage to Yani (Gregory Razaki), even though she is already dating another boy, the non-Greek David (Bill Bixby). Danny Thomas played the family priest. This was a pilot for Loren's own series, produced by Thomas and Aaron Spelling and was aired on NBC as a one-hour special.

Reprise Records
From 1967 to 1968, Loren recorded with Reprise, releasing "Let's Pretend" (B Side: "Once Before I Die") again produced by Jimmy Bowen, and arranged by Don Peake, and "As Long as I'm Holding You" (B Side: "It's Such a Shame"), produced by Mike Post. The recordings have been called "exceptional" showcases for Loren.

Retirement in 1968
By the end of 1968, Loren left show business to marry and raise a family. Loren married music producer Lenny Waronker, president of Warner Bros. Records, and had three children: Joey, Anna, and Katherine. Loren and Waronker divorced in the mid 1980s.

Modelling, writing, other work
In addition to her work for Dr Pepper, Loren was often featured in modelling and fashion spots geared toward teenagers, including for hats, exercise workouts, makeup, and dental care. In 1963 she was chosen by Simplicity Pattern Company to appear in a national advertisement campaign "If I Can Sew, You Can Sew", appearing in print and commercials. Loren was contractually signed because she made much of the wardrobe she appeared in during television and live performances. Francesco Scavullo took her portrait for Simplicity.

Loren also wrote two separate regular columns for Movie Life Magazine ("Donna Loren's Young Hollywood" in 1966 and "Let's Talk it Over" in 1967). She was also regularly featured in teen, television, and movie magazines of the 1960s as their cover girl.

1980s
Loren began recording again during the 1980s. In 1982 she released "Sedona", (B Side: "Simply Loving You"). She wrote and produced the songs for her own label Royalty Records. James Burton produced "Sedona" with Loren, played guitar and assembled other members of the Elvis Presley TCB Band, Ronnie Tutt (drums), Jerry Scheff (bass), and Glen D. Hardin (piano). Chris Hillman played mandolin. In the same year, Loren recorded "Wishin' and Hopin'" in Nashville with her longtime producer Jimmy Bowen with David Hungate from Toto (B Side: "Somewhere Down the Road"; Warner Bros). Loren also recorded a number of other songs (see section: Magic: The 80's Collection).

Loren appeared on The Merv Griffin Show in 1984 performing "Somewhere Down the Road". Other guests were Ed Asner, Sybil Danning, and Larry Miller. In introducing Loren to much applause, Griffin acknowledged Loren's return with the new single "after a long hiatus". In the same year, Loren produced a live concert in Sedona, Arizona she called "Star Series" based on the American Composer of the Year. She hired Henry Mancini, 1983 Composer of the Year, and the Flagstaff Symphony Orchestra, and in her introduction she sang "Always" by Irving Berlin. In 1985 Loren was invited to appear in Tokyo, Japan at an International Ballroom Dancing event, and also performed in a show in Beverly Hills, CA (Jerry Lee Lewis was also on the bill).

ADASA Hawaii
In 1995 Loren married Jered Cargman. Loren and Cargman knew each other in the 1960s and Cargman was her prom date. Cargman was a member of the surf band The Fantastic Baggys. Moving to Hawaii, Loren decided to turn her design and fashion interest into a business (Loren had designed and made clothes since her teenage years and continued to do so after she retired). After premiering a couture collection in 1998 and being chosen by Honolulu Magazine as one of Hawaii's best new designers, she and Cargman launched ADASA Hawaii, which included a boutique in Waimea and three boutiques on Oahu. Loren was guest stylist on an episode of A Makeover Story (16 February 2004), with one of her boutiques featured on the show.

Return to Performing 2009-present

Swinging Sixties Productions and "It Only Hurts When I Cry"
Loren turned again to writing music. In 2009, Loren and husband Cargman started their label Swinging Sixties Productions which, in conjunction with Swinging Sixties Music, publish and release Loren's music.  Loren's first release in August, 2009 was a remake of "It Only Hurts When I Cry", which she produced and arranged, releasing it both as a music video on YouTube and as a single to download. Drew Saber played guitar on the track and appears in the music video. Maurice Gainen engineered the song, and would also engineer Loren's album Love It Away.

Magic
In the same month as the release of the single, Loren's Magic: The 80's Collection was released, both as a download and later as an enhanced CD. This was a collection of songs Loren recorded at Amigo Studios during the early 1980s, with musicians such as John Thomas and James Burton. Seven of the songs on the album had not previously been released.

In a review for the album, Magic was described as containing "Great production and a flawlessly effortless vocal montage".

Magic: The 80's Collection (2009; Swinging Sixties Productions)

Love It Away

In January 2010 Love It Away was released, first as a download and then as an album. This was Loren's first album of completely new material since 1965. Loren produced the album, and it was recorded both in Hawaii at Lava Tracks Studio and Los Angeles. "Love It Away" was recorded at Lava Tracks. Maurice Gainen engineered the album, with Gainen and Charles Michael Brotman mixing and mastering. Mark Arbeit photographed Loren for the album, which includes her wearing one of her couture designs for the cover. Loren also wrote a paragraph for the insert booklet setting the tone of the album. Love It Away contains eight original songs by Loren. Among the covers Loren performed were "Last Night I Had a Dream" by Randy Newman, "Live Nude Cabaret" by Jackson Browne, "Old Man" by Neil Young, "I'll Be Your Baby Tonight" by Bob Dylan, as well "Shakin' All Over", a rockabilly classic she once performed on Shindig. Musicians who worked on the album include Jamieson Trotter, Bob Glaub, Maelan Abran, and Loren's former collaborator Carol Kaye. Loren also played piano and synthesizer on many tracks.

Love It Away (2010, Swinging Sixties Productions)

Album produced by Donna Loren.

Love It Away was "Pick of the Week" (review posted June 8, 2010) on MuzikReviews.com. The album received four-stars. Loren's original pieces and her interpretation of songs such as "Old Man" were particularly praised, and the review drew attention to Loren's vocal ("The main instrument is her voice") and the production:

"I think one of the reasons for the success of this recording besides Donna's flat out stunning vocal performance, is the production being kept to a minimum and the instrumentation generally focuses on the keyboards highlighting the sweet sensual vocals of Ms. Loren."

The autobiographical nature of the material was also discussed, "The importance of this release can be found beyond the music, it is a personal statement from the artist and her heartfelt interpretation of her feelings relating to her own life".

"Love It Away (Remix)"
The first single from the album was a remix of "Love It Away", which is also included on the CD as the final track and was released as a single to download. As of June, 2010 the single was charting on a Top 40 Adult Contemporary radio play chart.

Music videos
Loren released several music videos in conjunction with Love It Away on YouTube. "Shakin' All Over" was released as two videos in March and May, 2010 and both include footage from her original performance of the song on Shindig. "Love It Away" was released in March, 2010 and "Last Night I Had a Dream" and "I'll Be Your Baby Tonight" in July, 2010.

Beach Party Movie Medley
In May, 2010, Loren released a medley of her Beach Party songs "Beach Blanket Bingo", "Muscle Bustle", "Love's a Secret Weapon", "It Only Hurts When I Cry", and "Among the Young". A video of the recording session at Lava Tracks Studios was also released on YouTube. Loren recorded new versions of "Beach Blanket Bingo" and "Muscle Bustle", as singles to download. Loren again worked with Charles Michael Brotman on this project.

"Eloquent" (Single)
In July, 2010, Loren released the dance-electronic "Eloquent" as a single to download. She wrote and produced the song.

"Merry Christmas Baby" and Donna Does Elvis in Hawaii
On November 1, 2010, the single "Merry Christmas Baby" was officially released for download (having been pre-released in the Donna Loren Store on her website a few days before the official release). Written by Lou Baxter and Johnny Moore and first recorded by Johnny Moore's Three Blazers in 1947, the R&B standard was recorded by Elvis Presley for his album Elvis Sings the Wonderful World of Christmas (1971). The release is Loren's second recording of a Christmas song; the first was "I Think It's Almost Christmas Time" when she was 10 years old. She also performed "Santa Claus Is Coming to Town" on Shindig in 1964.

The song was followed by the release of Donna Does Elvis in Hawaii on November 15, 2010, an EP of her renditions of four Presley songs. In addition to "Merry Christmas Baby", Loren recorded "Loving You", "(Let Me Be Your) Teddy Bear", and "One Night". "Loving You" and "(Let Me Be Your) Teddy Bear" were both recorded in 2010, with a sample of "Loving You" appearing on Loren's blog two months prior to the release. "One Night" was recorded in the 1980s at Amigo Studios and, like many of the songs on her 2009 album Magic from these recording sessions, had not been previously released. The EP was produced by Loren, and she again worked with Maurice Gainen and Charles Michael Brotman and musician Jamieson Trotter, as well as new collaborators Sonny Lim and Wailau Ryder.

The EP makes use of a number of themes related to Loren, Elvis Presley, Hawaii, and Hollywood. Loren explained on radio show The Sheena Metal Experience (LA Talk Radio) on November 4, 2010, the evolving of the concept:

"When I was looking for just the right [Christmas] song to do, I thought of Elvis. And so when I started doing research to do a Christmas song of Elvis', I started seeing songs that really resonated with me, especially a song called "Loving You" which, when the time drew nearer when we were departing Hawaii, was so healing for me."

The song "Loving You" was recorded at Lava Tracks Studio and represented Loren's moving from "my beloved Hawaii" to California. The selection of other Presley songs further fits the concept nature of the EP for, as Loren acknowledged, "Elvis and Hawaii go hand-in-hand". The artwork for the single and the EP, both designed by Katie Waronker's company Riot Structure, blended Hawaiian-inspired imagery including Presley's 1961 LP Blue Hawaii as inspiration for the "Merry Christmas Baby" cover art, and a depiction of Kalakaua Blvd in Waikiki (with Los Angeles-inspired billboards featuring Loren, photographed by Mark Arbeit) for the cover of the EP. The back of the EP includes a picture of Loren from the 1960s.

Further links between Presley and Loren include Presley's recording "I Believe" for his EP Peace in the Valley in 1957, a song Loren also recorded at Capitol, and which she regularly performed. Loren also recorded with the Elvis Presley TCB Band for her 1980's single "Sedona" during the Amigo Studios recording sessions which also produced "One Night" from the EP.

She performed "One Night" at the 26th Annual Elvis Birthday Bash at the Echo in Los Angeles on January 8, 2012, and again performed at the 28th Annual Elvis Birthday Bash at the Echo on January 5, 2014.

Donna Does Elvis in Hawaii (2010, Swinging Sixties Productions) 

EP produced by Donna Loren.

"Moonlight Kisses" (Single)
On February 25, 2012, "Moonlight Kisses" was released as a single to download. The song was written and produced by Loren, and she again worked with guitarist Charles Michael Brotman.

Appearances in conjunction with Loren's new work
Loren accompanied the release of her new material with numerous appearances on radio shows, interviews, and public appearances. An article in Beverly Hills Courier in March, 2010 profiled her new work, beginning with "Donna Loren was the "It Girl" long before Paris Hilton and Kim Kardashian hit the streets of Beverly Hills".

She hosted a "Beach Party Movie Marathon" (Muscle Beach Party and Beach Blanket Bingo were shown) presented by American Cinematheque at the Egyptian Theatre, Hollywood on February 11, 2010, debuting the medley of her Beach Party songs. She would sing the medley and "Love It Away" for a Thrillville's "Valentine's Beach Party" at The Balboa Theatre, San Francisco on February 14, 2010, which screened Beach Blanket Bingo, and performed again at "Movie Night at the Blue Dragon" at the Blue Dragon Coastal Cuisine and Musiquarium in Kawaihae, Hawaii on April 28, 2010.

Liz Smith included a feature on Loren in her column on March 17, 2010. On June 25, 2010, Loren was interviewed on the nationally syndicated radio show Little Steven's Underground Garage, hosted by Steven Van Zandt.

Since returning to performing in 2009, Loren regularly attends autograph shows and conventions, where she meets fans and performs. Loren performed and met fans at the three-day Rock Con Festival, held July 30-August 1, 2010, in East Rutherford, New Jersey. Among the over 100 other artists and guests appearing were Billy Hinsche, Al Jardine, Paul Petersen, Hilton Valentine, Mary Wilson, and members of the girl-groups The Angels and The Delicates. She appeared and performed at the Monkees Convention in both 2013 (with Micky Dolenz and Peter Tork attending) and 2014 (with Dolenz, Tork, and Michael Nesmith). In 2016, she headlined the four-day Tiki Oasis festival in San Diego, performing a concert on Friday, 19 August.

In 2013, Loren was part of the choir for the song “If I Had the Time (I Could Change the World),” which was written and produced by Dick Wagner to benefit St. Jude Children’s Research Hospital. She performed the theme song, "The Devil Made Her Do It! (I Can’t Help It)," for the 2017 documentary Mansfield 66/67, which is also included on the film's soundtrack album.

She has regularly performed online concerts on Stageit.com under the name Donna Loren's Shindig!

Theater
On May 9, 2011, Loren performed in The Vagina Monologues, as part of V-Day Valley 2011, produced and directed by Sheena Metal at CAP (Complete Actors Place) Theater. There were three performances (May 8, 9, and 10) with rotating celebrity casts. The other performers on May 9 were Sharron Alexis, Shay Astar, Jill Bennett, Jillian Boyd, Simona Brhlikova, Carlease Burke, Cathy DeBuono, Danielle Egnew, Thea Gill, Mary E. Kennedy, Geri Jewell, Deirdre Lovejoy, Sandy Martin, Sheena Metal, Ann Noble, Linda Purl, Kim Rhodes, Sandra Valls, and Suzanne Westenhoefer.

Later projects

, Loren was working on new songwriting and recording projects and a full memoir. Throughout 2015, Loren released YouTube videos as she relearnt 100 songs that she recorded and/or performed in the 1960s; a project that she continued in 2016.

In July 2017, Pop Sixties: Shindig!, Dick Clark, Beach Party, and Photographs from the Donna Loren Archive, a photographic retrospective of Loren's career with narrative by Loren and Domenic Priore, and photos largely by her adopted father Morey Zukor, was released by Rare Bird Books. She promoted the book at book signings and personal appearances, in print interviews, and on radio and television, including the TV interview series Ken Boxer Live on 19 April 2018 (TVSB), Studio 411 hosted by Larry DaSilva on 30 May 2018 (Nutmeg TV), and LIVE Magazine TV on 30 June 2018 (KPSE).

On October 20, 2017, Loren, a graduate of the class of 1963, was inducted into the Venice High School Hall of Fame at the school's Homecoming.

In August 2020, Loren began hosting Love's A Secret Weapon Podcast, an audio memoir involving Loren reading passages from her completed memoir manuscript and conversations with her collaborator Adam Gerace.

On April 18, 2022, Loren released a single, "God Only Knows", a song she wrote and produced.

Filmography
Muscle Beach Party (1964)
Bikini Beach (1964)
Pajama Party (1964)
Beach Blanket Bingo (1965)
Sergeant Deadhead (1965)

Other releases and media

These Are the Good Times: The Complete Capitol Recordings 
On March 7, 2014, 1960s-focused reissue label Now Sounds (distributed by Cherry Red Records) officially announced the compilation These Are the Good Times: The Complete Capitol Recordings. The CD was released from the UK-based label April 14, with the US release following on April 22, 2014.

The compilation consists of the Beach Blanket Bingo LP, all of Loren's other Capitol-released material, songs not released until the 2000s, and eight previously unreleased songs. The unreleased material includes work with producers, arrangers and writers with whom Loren worked on her released Capitol material, such as Steve Douglas and Jack Nitzsche and the song writing team of Gerry Goffin-Carole King. Other songs were written by Al Kooper, Randy Newman, and Jackie DeShannon. The new tracks also include The Wrecking Crew, who were the musicians for many of Loren's Capitol (including Beach Blanket Bingo) and earlier recordings. The CD booklet features previously unpublished photos, and liner notes from Sheryl Farber. Steve Stanley and Farber produced the compilation.

Reception

These Are the Good Times was heavily praised on its release. In his AllMusic review, Mark Deming, who gave the compilation four-and-a-half stars out of five, wrote that "the best stuff here is delicious, beautifully crafted '60s West Coast pop, with a gifted and savvy vocalist front and center." Deming considered the previously unreleased songs to be "some of the strongest material" on the album, and he felt that "there's a strength and maturity in her performances on tunes like 'A Woman in Love (With You)', 'Hold Your Head High', and 'Leave Him to Me' that outstrips a significant majority of her peers – all the more impressive considering she was just 18 when most of this was recorded."

In The Second Disc review of the album, the compilation was described as "a must for aficionados of both the girl-group and SoCal pop sound of the sixties", with writer Joe Marchese noting that "fans of the Los Angeles sound will recognize every name here, all at the top of their game: producers David Axelrod, the outré pop guru, and Steve Douglas, Wrecking Crew saxophonist; arrangers Jack Nitzsche, H. B. Barnum, Gene Page and Billy Strange; musicians Hal Blaine, Carol Kaye, Lyle Ritz, Ray Pohlman, Tommy Tedesco, Larry Knechtel, Don Randi, Plas Johnson, Julius Wechter, and future headliners Glen Campbell and Leon Russell."

Marchese singled out a number of tracks, including the Axelrod-produced, Barnum-arranged songs "Just a Little Girl", which he thought was "one of the strongest of her tenure with the label", and "Leave Him to Me", which "shows Donna cutting loose with a convincing growl in her voice"; and the Douglas-produced, Nitzsche-arranged songs "Call Me", finding it "inexplicable that she didn’t chart with it", "Donna’s sublime rendition" of "Woman in Love (With You)", and "Hold Your Head High" which was considered "another stunningly mature, previously unreleased track from the Loren/Nitzsche/Douglas/Wrecking Crew cadre." Marchese also highlighted Now Sounds "customarily impressive packaging, design and notes", and described the tracks as having been "splendidly remastered".

Joseph Kyle wrote that the album "document[s] a young talent’s creative fruits, and is a delight of a listen", while Vic Templar, in UK-based Shindig! magazine, said that Loren "comes across as a US equivalent of Kathy Kirby, Billie Davis or early Dusty", telling readers "Yes, she’s that good." As with other reviews, Now's "as-standard loving care, exhaustive sleeve notes by Sheryl Farber and stunning photographs" were praised.

These Are the Good Times was a 2014 Gold Bonus Disc Award winner, with the compilation described as "an ingenious album that never was" and "an invigorating discovery".

Compilations
Loren has been featured on a number of other compilations, including one of all her 1960s-released songs from Capitol, The Very Best of Donna Loren Featuring Beach Blanket Bingo (2000), a product of EMI-Capitol Music Special Markets and distributed by Collectables Records.

Table does not include all releases.

Loren has also been interviewed and profiled in a number of books, including It's Party Time by Stephen J. McParland (John Blair, 1992), Swingin' Chicks of the Sixties by Chris Strodder (Cedco, 2000), Drive-In Dream Girls by Tom Lisanti (McFarland & Company, 2003), The Encyclopedia of Sixties Cool, also by Strodder (Santa Monica Press, 2007), and Whatever Became of...? by Richard Lamparski (Crown Publishers, 1985). Loren was interviewed for the television documentary Hollywood Rocks the Movies: The Early Years (1955–1970) (2000), and was also profiled and interviewed for a segment on the television series Hawaiian Moving Company (2002). She is heard singing "Crazy" (uncredited) during the ice-skating scene where Paul proposes to Jamie in the 1994 Mad About You episode "Cold Feet".

References

External links

Donna Loren Official Website
Donna Loren Official Facebook Page
Donna Loren Official Facebook Profile
Donna Loren on Twitter
Donna Loren on MySpace Music
Donna Loren's "Love's A Secret Weapon Podcast"
Interview with Donna Loren at Classic Film & TV Cafe, 8 June 2010

1947 births
Living people
Musicians from Boston
American women singers
20th-century American actresses
21st-century American actresses
Crest Records artists
Actresses from Boston
Venice High School (Los Angeles) alumni